Ameriyeh-ye Bala (also Romanized as Āmerīyeh-ye Bālā; also known as Āmerīyeh and ‘Āmerīyeh) is a village in Borj-e Akram Rural District, in the Central District of Fahraj County, Kerman Province, Iran. At the 2006 census, its population was 423, in 99 families.

References 

Populated places in Fahraj County